Titus Adams (born January 28, 1983) is a former American football defensive end. He was drafted by the New York Jets in the seventh round of the 2006 NFL Draft. He played college football at Nebraska.

Adams has also been a member of the New York Giants, San Diego Chargers, Cincinnati Bengals and New England Patriots.

Early years
Adams was born in Omaha, Nebraska, and was a standout defensive tackle for Creighton Preparatory School. There he was a two-time all-state selection and led his team to the state championship back to back years. They won the state title in 1999, and finished runner-up in 2000. Adams participated in the first ever U.S. Army All-American Bowl game on December 30, 2000, and was named to several All-American teams, including those of Parade magazine and Rivals.com.

College career
Adams played defensive tackle in college for the University of Nebraska. In 49 games with the Huskers, Adams started 22 times. He recorded 135 tackles (60 solos) with 3.5 sacks, 16 tackles for losses and 26 quarterback pressures. He recovered two fumbles, deflected three passes and intercepted two others. He graduated with a degree in business administration.

Professional career
Adams was drafted by the New York Jets in the seventh round of the 2006 NFL Draft but released by the team on September 2, 2006. He was re-signed to the Jets' practice squad on September 6, 2006. In December of that year, the New York Giants signed Adams from the Jets' practice squad to their 53-man roster. Adams spent the rest of the season with the team and was waived on August 17, 2007. Adams was claimed off waivers by the Chargers on August 20, 2007, but waived on August 31, 2007. The Cincinnati Bengals signed Adams to their practice squad on December 18, 2007. He was re-signed to a future contract on December 31, 2007, but released by the team on July 7, 2008. In July 2008, Adams was signed by the New England Patriots. He was waived on August 30 and re-signed to the team's practice squad on September 1.

After spending the 2008 season on the practice squad, Adams was waived again on September 5, 2009, and re-signed to the team's practice squad the next day. On December 9 he was promoted to the active roster. He played in his first NFL game on December 13 against the Carolina Panthers, recording two tackles at nose tackle. He was waived on December 31.

Adams was claimed off waivers by the Cleveland Browns on January 1, 2010.

References

External links
Cleveland Browns bio

1983 births
Living people
Sportspeople from Omaha, Nebraska
Players of American football from Nebraska
African-American players of American football
American football defensive tackles
American football defensive ends
Nebraska Cornhuskers football players
New York Jets players
New York Giants players
San Diego Chargers players
Cincinnati Bengals players
New England Patriots players
Cleveland Browns players
21st-century African-American sportspeople
20th-century African-American people